Bonne-Espérance and Bonne-Esperance which is French for  "Good Hope" may refer to:

Bonne-Espérance, Belgium, the location of Bonne-Espérance Abbey
Bonne-Espérance, Quebec,  municipality in the Côte-Nord region of the province of Quebec in Canada
Bonne Esperance, United States Virgin Islands (disambiguation):
Bonne Esperance, Saint Croix, United States Virgin Islands
Bonne Esperance, Saint Thomas, U.S. Virgin Islands